René Matte (born February 11, 1935 in Saint-Casimir, Quebec; died February 2016 at Chambly, Quebec) was a Canadian politician and a Member of the House of Commons.

Political career

Before entering electoral politics, Matte was a member of organizations that supported the independence of Quebec: the Ralliement national, the Mouvement Souveraineté-Association, Alliance laurentienne.

At the beginning of the 1960s, for a short time, Matte was active in la Phalange, a minor group of right-wing nationalists. Because of his links to this group, he was arrested in 1963  by the Sûreté du Québec, who suspected him and his brother, Jean-Paul, of being involved in the dismantling of the statue of General Wolfe on the plains of Abraham, Quebec. The two men were released, for lack of evidence.

Matte ran as a Ralliement Créditiste candidate in the federal district of Champlain in the 1968 election and won.  His party rejoined the national Social Credit Party of Canada in 1971.  He was re-elected in the 1972 and 1974 elections.

He ran for the leadership of the Social Credit Party in 1976 advocating that Canada be divided into five sovereign regions in a loose confederation He placed second to federalist André-Gilles Fortin after several Social Credit MPs threatened to leave the party if Matte won. Matte ran for the leadership again in 1978 but abruptly resigned from the party to sit as an independent when its national executive decided to hold the leadership convention in Winnipeg. Interim leader Charles-Arthur Gauthier stated that Matte was expelled after refusing to follow party discipline for 18 months.

He ran as an independent candidate in the 1979 federal election and was defeated by Liberal candidate Michel Veillette.  Matte ran again in 1980 as a New Democratic Party candidate, but finished second.

He died in February 2016 from a serious liver illness in the home of his son, Michel, in Chambly, Quebec.

Electoral record

Footnotes

1935 births
2016 deaths
Members of the House of Commons of Canada from Quebec
Social Credit Party of Canada MPs